Hibbertia hexandra, commonly known as tree guinea flower, is a species of flowering plant in the family Dilleniaceae and is endemic to eastern Australia. It is a tall shrub or small tree with mostly lance-shaped leaves with the narrower end towards the base and yellow flowers arranged singly in leaf axils, with six stamens arranged around two hairy carpels.

Description
Hibbertia hexandra is a tall shrub or small tree with its branches covered with star-shaped hairs. The upper surface of the leaves is glabrous with minute pimples and the lower surface is whitish and covered with star-shaped hairs.

Taxonomy
Hibbertia hexandra was first formally described in 1942 by Cyril Tenison White in the Proceedings of the Royal Society of Queensland from specimens he collected in Lamington National Park in 1934. The specific epithet (hexandra) means "six stamens", referring to the leaves.

Distribution and habitat
This hibbertia grows in rainforest, open forest and heath, mostly in the ranges near the Queensland-New South Wales border. Collections near Wauchope may be of a new species.

Conservation status
Hibbertia hexandra is listed as "endangered" under the Biodiversity Conservation Act 2016 and as "near threatened" under the Queensland Government Nature Conservation Act 1992.

See also
List of Hibbertia species

References

hexandra
Flora of New South Wales
Flora of Queensland
Plants described in 1942
Taxa named by Cyril Tenison White